Conversation Pieces is a reworking of the Animated Conversations concept. It consists of a series of five shorts which aired on Channel Four between 1982 and 1983. Each of the 5 shorts were five minutes long.

As AllAboutAardman explains, "in the series plasticine personalities enact scenarios suggested by documentary-style recorded dialogue".

List of shorts

 On Probation (1983)
 Sales Pitch (1983)
 Palmy Days (1983)
 Early Bird (1983)
 Late Edition (1983)

References

British short films